Newham railway station was a railway station that served the hamlet of Newham Hall, Northumberland, England from 1851 to 1950 on the East Coast Main Line.

History 
The station opened on 1 February 1851 by the York, Newcastle and Berwick Railway. It was situated on both sides of the level crossing on an unnamed road southwest of the hamlet of Newham. Two sidings were to the south of the level crossing facing the down platform; one was elevated above the coal loading bank. Newham was one of the seven stations to be closed due to the Second World War and it reopened on 7 October 1946 but the Sunday services were stopped. There were very few services after the station reopened; there was an 8-hour gap from 9:30am to 5:34pm. This failed to attract passengers and it inevitably closed on 25 September 1950 and goods traffic stopped on the same day.

References 

Disused railway stations in Northumberland
Former North Eastern Railway (UK) stations
Railway stations in Great Britain opened in 1847
Railway stations in Great Britain closed in 1941
Railway stations in Great Britain opened in 1946
Railway stations in Great Britain closed in 1950
1851 establishments in England
1950 disestablishments in England